The Suzuki SV650 and its variants are street motorcycles manufactured since 1999 by Suzuki. In 2009, Suzuki replaced the standard SV650 with the SFV650 Gladius. In 2016, the Gladius name was discontinued and the 2017 model was reverted to SV650.

First generation (1999–2002)

Suzuki introduced the SV650 in 1999 as a budget entry in the emerging naked bike market and featured both naked and fully faired versions.  The bike provided a sporty though easily manageable ride. The combination of light weight, rigid chassis, strong handling, and the V-twin's strong mid-range torque appealed to beginner and experienced riders alike. The 2003 SV1000 was marketed as a bigger alternative to the second generation SV650.

The SV650 immediately became popular, but American buyers wanted the sportier 'S' version that featured lower handlebars, higher foot pegs and a bikini fairing and windscreen, available only in the European and Canadian markets.  American magazines ran articles describing how to import it into the United States. In 2000, Suzuki began importing the SV650S to the USA.

The SV650 with its relatively low purchase price and excellent handling characteristics became popular with racers which prompted a rebirth of the "lightweight twins" racing classes across North America and the SV650 began outselling the Suzuki GS500, Honda NT650 and Kawasaki Ninja 500R, which previously populated the class.

Second generation (2003–2012)

In 2003, Suzuki redesigned the SV650 with a new pressure-cast aluminum truss frame, bodywork, swing-arm with revised rear brake caliper mounting, exhaust, digital speedometer display and electronic fuel injection/induction system to replace the carburetor.

The 2003 SV650s also supported some first generation parts (like the rearsets and radiator). The subframe is also angled up higher than 2004+ models. The different subframe has year-specific parts, such as the rider seat, plastic frame covers, exhaust hanger brackets and passenger pegs.

For 2004, Suzuki used a new, 40 mm lower subframe and a seat with a narrower design in the front. This made flat footing easier for shorter riders.  The trail was raised by 2 mm, and the rear fender was restyled to clean up the area under the tail lights and provide more protection against flying debris.

For 2007, both SV650 and SV650S added dual spark plugs per cylinder, and an exhaust gas oxygen sensor on California models for reduced emissions. An anti-lock braking system (ABS) was also added as an option.

For 2008, alongside the traditional SV650 and SV650S models, Suzuki offered a new SV650 Sport (UK) or SV650SF (US) model with a more traditional complete fairing. The SV650S was removed from the US market.

In September 2008, Suzuki Australia introduced the SV650SU, a de-tuned version of the SV650S, to augment their range of motorcycles that comply with the country's Learner Approved Motorcycle Scheme (LAMS).

The 2009 Suzuki SFV650 Gladius replaced the SV650 naked version in the USA; however, a naked 2009 SV650 was available in Canada.  Although the naked version was superseded by the Gladius, the SV650S model remained in the UK and Australian line-up through to 2012.

Third generation (2017)
The 2017 model released in 2016, SV650/A has returned to the more conventional styling of the pre-Gladius naked version. Suzuki claims the wet weight for the non-ABS model is 195 kg (430 lbs), and 197 kg (434 lbs) for the ABS model. Its engine develops an additional four horsepower and features a low-speed stalling prevention system ("low RPM assist") to make the bike more suited to beginners and easier to ride in stop/go traffic. It meets Euro 4 emission regulations. It has a new slim steel frame. Seat height is 785mm (30.9"). Fuel tank capacity is 13.8 litres, or 15.5 litres in the US market. It has twin front disc brakes and new 39mm slimmer and lighter throttle bodies.
In November 2015 Suzuki announced at EICMA 2015 that the SV650 would return in 2016 as a 2017-model year product. Preload adjusters are fitted to 2018 models. A cafe-racer version of the SV650 was launched in 2019 with a front pre-load adjustment.

Current market situation 
Other twin cylinder motorcycles in the class include the Yamaha MT07 / Yamaha XSR700 and Kawasaki Z650 / Kawasaki Ninja 650.  The SV650 is more affordable than the likes of the Ducati Monster, Ducati Scrambler, and KTM 790 Duke, but has similar performance.

Specifications

See also 
Suzuki SV1000
Suzuki V-Strom 650
Suzuki V-Strom 1000

References

External links 
 Suzuki SV650 (1999-on) review
 Suzuki Gladius 650 (2009-on) review
 Suzuki SV650 (2016-on) review
 1999 Suzuki SV650
 2000 Valuebike shootout

SV650
Standard motorcycles
Motorcycles introduced in 1999